Qamışoba, Qamışovka (?-2018) (also, Qamişovka, Kamyshevka, and Kamyshovka) is a village in the Astara Rayon of Azerbaijan.  The village forms part of the municipality of Bala Şahağac.

References 

Populated places in Astara District